The American Anthropometric Society was an association for acquiring and storing brains of eminent persons for the purpose of research. The society was founded in 1889 in Philadelphia. Edward Anthony Spitzka, M.D., professor of anatomy at Jefferson Medical College, presented a paper on March 16, 1906, about his study of six brains bequeathed to the society.

The brains are now housed at the Wistar Institute in Philadelphia.

Similar organizations
Mutual Autopsy Society of Paris, founded 1881
Cornell Brain Association

References

Organizations established in 1889
Neuroscience organizations